Devi Prasad Shetty FRCS (born 8 May 1953) is an Indian entrepreneur and cardiac surgeon who is the chairman and founder of Narayana Health, a chain of 21 medical centers in India. He has performed more than 100,000 heart operations. In 2004 he was awarded the Padma Shri, the fourth highest civilian award, followed by the Padma Bhushan in 2012, the third highest civilian award by the Government of India for his contribution to the field of affordable healthcare. There is an episode about his life and work on the Netflix TV series The Surgeon's Cut (episode 4).

Early life and education
Shetty was born in Kinnigoli, a village in the Dakshina Kannada district, Karnataka, India. The eighth of nine children, he decided to become a heart surgeon when he was a school student after hearing about Christiaan Barnard, a South African surgeon who had just performed the world's first heart transplant.

He was educated at St. Aloysius School, Mangaluru. He completed his MBBS in 1979, and post-graduate work in General Surgery from Kasturba Medical College, Mangalore. Later he completed FRCS from Royal College of Surgeons, England.

Career
He returned to India in 1989 and initially worked at B.M. Birla Hospital in Kolkata. He successfully performed the first neonatal heart surgery in the country in 1992, on a 21-day-old baby Ronnie. In Kolkata he operated on Mother Teresa after she had a heart attack, and subsequently served as her personal physician. After some time, he moved to Bangalore and started the Manipal Heart Foundation at Manipal Hospitals, Bangalore. Financial contribution for the construction of the hospital was provided by Shetty's father-in-law.

In 2001, Shetty founded Narayana Hrudayalaya (NH), a multi-specialty hospital in Bommasandra on the outskirts of Bangalore. He believes that the cost of healthcare can be reduced by 50 percent in the next 5–10 years if hospitals adopt the idea of economies of scale. Apart from cardiac surgery, NH also has cardiology, neurosurgery, paediatric surgery, haematology and transplant services, and nephrology among various others. The heart hospital is the largest in the world with 1000 beds performing over 30 major heart surgeries a day. The land on which the health city was built, was previously a marshland which was reclaimed for this purpose. The Health City intends to cater to about 15,000 outpatients every day.

In August 2012 Shetty announced an agreement with TriMedx, a subsidiary of Ascension Health, to create a joint venture for a chain of hospitals in India. In the past Narayana Hrudayalaya has collaborated with Ascension Health to set up a health care city in the Cayman Islands, planned to eventually have 2,000 beds.

Shetty also founded Rabindranath Tagore International Institute of Cardiac Sciences (RTIICS) in Kolkata, and signed a memorandum of understanding with the Karnataka Government to build 5,000-bed specialty hospital near Bangalore International Airport. His company signed a MOU with the Government of Gujarat, to set up a 5,000-bed hospital at Ahmedabad.

He was a part of the seven-member panel of Board of Governors which replaced the MCI and served for a period of one year before it was further reconstituted.

Low cost health care 
Shetty aims for his hospitals to use economies of scale, to allow them to complete heart surgeries at a lower cost than in the United States. In 2009 The Wall Street Journal newspaper described him as "the Henry Ford of heart surgery". Six additional hospitals were subsequently planned on the Narayana Hrudayalaya model at several cities in India, with plans to expand to 30,000 beds with hospitals in India, Africa and other countries in Asia. Shetty aims to trim costs with such measures as buying cheaper scrubs and using cross ventilation instead of air conditioning.  That has cut the price of coronary bypass surgery to 95,000 rupees ($1,583), half of what it was 20 years ago. In 2013 he aimed to get the price down to $800 within a decade. The same procedure costs $106,385 at Ohio's Cleveland Clinic. He has also eliminated many pre-ops testing and innovated in patient care such as "drafting and training patients' family members to administer after-surgical care". Surgeons in his hospitals perform 30 to 35 surgeries a day compared to one or two in a US hospital. His hospitals also provide substantial free care especially for poor children. Whereas urban India calls him "Henry Ford" for his assembly line approach to heart surgeries, rural Indians calls him "Bypasswale Baba" as attested by thousands of sources such as the Deccan Herald, the English newspaper with the largest circulation in Karnataka, Shetty's home state. This is because, like a saint (or Rishi in Indian mythology), anybody who comes to Devi Shetty's Ashram/hospital gets a bypass if he or she dreams of it. 

Shetty and his family have a 75 percent stake in Narayana Hrudayalaya which he plans to preserve. Shetty has also pioneered low-cost diagnostic services. He was appointed as chairman of the COVID-19 task force in Karnataka which was criticized by global health doctors as being a cardiac surgeon, he did not have the epidemiological approach to COVID-19 management.

Yeshasvini
Yeshasvini is a low-cost health insurance scheme, designed by Shetty and the Government of Karnataka for the poor farmers of the state, with 4 million people currently covered. Aortic type b dissection is not covered in the scheme.

Awards and recognition
Padma Bhushan award for Medicine in 2012
Karnataka Ratna award in 2001 
Entrepreneur of the Year at ET awards in 2012
Won the 2011 The Economist Innovation Awards for the Business process field.
Honorary degree, University of Minnesota in 2011 
Honorary degree, ‘Honoris Causa’ Degree of ‘Doctor of Science’ by Indian Institute of Technology Madras in 2014 
Schwab Foundation's award in 2005
Padma Shri award for Medicine in 2004
Dr. B C Roy award in 2003
Sir M. Visvesvaraya Memorial Award in 2003 
Ernst & Young – Entrepreneur Of The Year – Life Sciences in 2012
Ernst & Young – Entrepreneur of the Year – Start-up in 2003
Rajyotsava award in 2002 
Indian Of The Year (Public Sector) by CNN-IBN for 2012

Television
Shetty stars in the fourth (and last) episode of Netflix's docuseries The Surgeon's Cut, which was released globally on 9 December 2020. The episode follows Shetty's treatment of patients, mostly children and babies, prioritizing low-cost and affordable healthcare while performing with his team more than thirty surgeries a day.

See also
Narayana Health

References

External links

 Profile - Devi Prasad Shetty

Indian cardiac surgeons
Indian philanthropists
Medical doctors from Bangalore
Mangaloreans
Tulu people
1953 births
Living people
Recipients of the Padma Shri in medicine
Recipients of the Karnataka Ratna
Manipal Academy of Higher Education alumni
Fellows of the Royal College of Surgeons
Recipients of the Padma Bhushan in medicine
20th-century Indian medical doctors
Scientists from Mangalore
Physicians of Guy's Hospital
Winners of the Nikkei Asia Prize
20th-century surgeons